Industrias Nacionales, also known as INCA, was the leading manufacturer of construction goods in the Dominican Republic. It is headquartered in the Isabela Industrial Zone of Santo Domingo on the outer banks of the Isabela River. In 2013, after merging with competitor Metaldom, it re-branded under the banner of Gerdau Metaldom.

History 
INCA began as a nail factory in Santo Domingo after being acquired by Luis Garcia San Miguel in 1947. It was during the regime of dictator Trujillo that Luis Garcia expanded the factory's capabilities by making it a producer of wire mesh and iron gates. 

In 1974, Luis Garcia's son, Francisco Garcia Crespo, took over the company and began a process of vertical integration and expansion. This was symbolized with the introduction of new products and processes such as barbed wire and galvanizing capabilities.

By 2001, INCA expanded into the steel rebar business with the purchase of a state of the art steel rolling-mill. The rolling-mill is located 23 kilometers north of Santo Domingo in the Juan Pablo Duarte highway.

In 2007, INCA merged with Gerdau resulting in a 49% holding share for Gerdau and 51% for INCA.

In 2013, Gerdau became the controlling shareholder after INCA merged operations with MetalDom, a competing Dominican company. Both companies now operate under the banner of Gerdau Metaldom.

Business 
INCA now produces a wide range of construction products but is mainly focused on the production and distribution of steel rebar, PVC pipes and fittings, galvanized sheets, and nails. Its presence is felt all over the Caribbean and Latin American markets.

Competitors 
Arcelor Mittal

External links 

Manufacturing companies of the Dominican Republic